Bobby Di Cicco is an American actor best known for his early roles in the films I Wanna Hold Your Hand (1978) by Robert Zemeckis, 1941 (1979) by Steven Spielberg, Samuel Fuller's The Big Red One (1980), and the John Carpenter-produced The Philadelphia Experiment (1984).

Di Cicco is the father of voice actress Jessica DiCicco.

Filmography

Self
 Sam Fuller and the Big Red One (1979)
 Don Siegel: Last of the Independents (1980)
 The Making of 1941 (1996)
 The Men Who Made the Movies: Samuel Fuller (2002)
 Ban the Sadist Videos! (2005)
 The Real Glory - Reconstructing The Big Red One (2005)
 Video Nasties: Moral Panic, Censorship & Videotape (2010)

External links

References

20th-century births
American male film actors
American male television actors
Place of birth missing (living people)
1954 births
Living people
People from Itasca, Illinois
Male actors from Illinois
Date of birth missing (living people)
American people of Italian descent